The battle of Somerset (or Dutton's Hill) was a battle fought on March 31, 1863, during the American Civil War.  General John Pegram led a Confederate cavalry raid into central Kentucky which was defeated by Union forces under General Quincy A. Gillmore.

Background
In early 1863 Brigadier General John Pegram led a cavalry raid into Kentucky in the vicinity of Lexington.  Brigadier General Quincy A. Gillmore sought permission from Department of the Ohio commander, Major General Ambrose E. Burnside, to move against Pegram.  Although Gillmore had gained a reputation in artillery and engineering service, Burnside nevertheless authorized Gillmore to lead a mixed force of cavalry and mounted infantry.

Battle
By the time the Union forces responded, Pegram's cavalry had rounded up several hundred head of cattle.  Gillmore's force caught up with Pegram outside Somerset on March 31.  Gillmore drove Pegram's skirmishers up Dutton's Hill where the Confederates made a stand.  Making no headway at first, Union artillery was brought forward.  The 45th Ohio Infantry made a successful charge against the hill forcing the Confederates to retreat.

Results
Pegram retreated south of the Cumberland River leaving behind horses and much of his confiscated cattle.  The defeat brought a significant amount of tension between Pegram and his subordinates.

Gillmore's first independent field command was a success, though he continued to express interest in artillery and coastal service. General-in-Chief Henry W. Halleck transferred Gillmore to South Carolina for a proposed campaign against Charleston, South Carolina.

See also
 Battle of Dutton's Hill Monument

References

External links
Historical Marker

Somerset, Battle of
Somerset, Battle of
Somerset
Somerset, Kentucky
1863 in Kentucky
Somerset
March 1863 events